Colombo Express is one of the largest container ships in the world. When launched in 2005, she was claimed by her owner to be the world's largest container ship, a title she held until Emma Mærsk was launched in 2006.

She is owned by the German shipping company Hapag-Lloyd, and operated by its Hapag-Lloyd Container Line division. She is named for Colombo, the largest city in Sri Lanka, which the predecessor company, North American Lloyd, first called on in 1886.

Colombo Express has a gross tonnage of 93,750 and had a deadweight capacity of 104,400 tonnes. Built in South Korea by Hyundai Heavy Industries in 2004–2005, she was christened on 11 April 2005, and her diesel engine generates  of power.

Colombo Express operates out of the home port of Hamburg, and will mainly travel from Europe to Southeast Asia and back in 56-day round-trips.

Collision with Maersk Tanjong
On 29 September 2014, Colombo Express was involved in a collision with MV Maersk Tanjong,  sustained a  dent to its left side and causing delays to traffic through the Suez Canal. Footage of the incident was caught on video by a spectator and posted on YouTube.

Colombo Express class
Colombo Express class ships:
 Bremen Express
 Chicago Express
 Colombo Express
 Hanover Express
 Kuala Lumpur Express
 Kyoto Express
 Osaka Express
 Tsingtao Express

References

Container ships
Ships built by Hyundai Heavy Industries Group
2005 ships
Maritime incidents in 2014